Melissa Albert is an American author of young adult fiction.

Early life
Albert is from Illinois and attended the University of Iowa and Columbia College Chicago where she studied journalism. She was a managing editor at Barnes and Noble when she decided to write her first novel, a fairy tale noir for young adults.

Writing career
Her debut novel, The Hazel Wood, was on The New York Times bestseller list for 36 weeks. It received starred reviews from Publishers Weekly, School Library Journal and Kirkus Reviews. It was named a best young adult book of the year by Kirkus. Film rights were optioned by Sony, with Ashleigh Powell reportedly slated to adapt the screenplay.

The sequel, The Night Country, was published in 2020. It received a starred review from School Library Journal.

Personal life
Albert has one son. She lives in Brooklyn.

Bibliography

The Hazel Wood series 
  Illustrated by Jim Tierney.

Other works

References

Further reading 

 Interview at BookWeb.org
 Interview at Bustle
Something about the Author, Volume 333
Contemporary Authors, Volume 417

External links 

American writers of young adult literature
Living people
Year of birth missing (living people)
Writers from Illinois
21st-century American novelists
American women novelists
Columbia College Chicago alumni
University of Iowa alumni
21st-century American women writers